Saniyasnain Khan is an Indian television host and children's author of over 100 children's books on Islamic topics. He established Goodword Books in 1999.

He has also created board games for children on Islamic themes. A trustee of the Centre for Peace and Spirituality (CPS International) – a non-profit, non-political organization working towards peace and spirituality, he contributes articles on Islam and spirituality to English newspapers.

He is considered to be among the World's 500 Most Influential Muslims by the George Washington University, USA. His books have been translated into French, German, Italian, Spanish, Dutch, Danish, Polish, Swedish, Bosnian, Norwegian, Russian, Uzbek, Turkish, Arabic, Malay, Thai, Malayalam, Bengali, Urdu, etc.

Selected works
Khan's children's books include:

Tell Me About Hajj
Tell Me About the Prophet Yusuf
The Greatest Stories from the Quran

See also

 List of modern-day Muslim scholars
Wahiduddin Khan
Tazkirul Quran

References

1959 births
Indian children's writers
Indian Muslims
Living people
Muslim writers
People from Delhi
Delhi University alumni
People from Azamgarh